Beitar Ezra is an Israeli football club based in the Ezra neighbourhood of Tel Aviv. The club currently plays in Liga Gimel Tel Aviv division.
Today, the first Captain in the team is Gilor Bardush, and the secondary is Amir Itzhaki.

History
The club was founded in 1954 and played its entire history in the lower divisions of Israeli football.

Beitar joined Liga Gimel at the 1954–55 season, the last season in which Liga Gimel was the third tier of Israeli football league system. The club's best period was at the mid-1960s, when they won Liga Gimel Tel Aviv division in the 1962–63 season and promoted to Liga Bet, then the third tier. In the 1964–65 season, Beitar was topping the table of Liga Bet South A division after 15 games and was crowned as the "winter champions" of the league. However, drop in form saw the club finish the league at the seventh place. In the following season, the club finished second bottom and relegated back to Liga Gimel after three seasons playing in Liga Bet. From that point, the club became known as one of the worst teams in Israeli football. Beitar have conceded 202 goals at the "double season" of 1966–68, and in 1969, the club found itself playing at the newly formed bottom tier, Liga Dalet. In 1985, Liga Dalet was scrapped and the club returned to Liga Gimel, where they play since at the Tel Aviv division. The 2009–10 season was exceptional, as the club finished the league with even number of wins, draws and losses and with a positive goal difference of +14.

The club's founder and chairman, Tzadok Hamami, which holds UEFA Pro Licence, have also renewed his footballer card at age of 82. However, his last match as an active player for Beitar Ezra, was at 25 December 2009, aged 79, when he entered as substitute at the 90th minute in the 0–0 draw against Hapoel Neve Golan.

Honours

Current squad
 As to 16 January 2020

External links
Beitar Ezra The Israel Football Association 
Golden report – Tzadok Hamami The Sports Channel, YouTube

References

Ezra
Tel Aviv
Football clubs in Tel Aviv
Association football clubs established in 1954
1954 establishments in Israel